The Fight Within is a 2016 American Christian sports film featuring Dan Severn.

Plot

Cast
John Major Davis as Logan Chandler
Lelia Symington as Emma Jones
Matt Leddo as Hayden Dressler
Mike H. Taylor as Mason Chandler
Wesley Williams as Michael
Dan Severn as Rich Chandler

Reception
The film has a 40% rating on Rotten Tomatoes.  Noel Murray of the Los Angeles Times gave the film a negative review and wrote that it "is too generic as a sports flick, and too pro forma as a tract. There’s more vitality and humanity in the closing-credits blooper reel than in anything in the actual picture."  Joe Leydon of Variety also gave the film a negative review and described it as "clunky and didactic, and the movie as a whole has appreciably less mainstream appeal than several other recent, and much better, faith-based dramas."

However, Lawrence Toppman of The Charlotte Observer gave the film a positive review and wrote, "So when a filmmaker seems to wrestle seriously with (religious belief), I listen. In the case of The Fight Within, I’m glad I did."  Edwin L. Carpenter of The Dove Foundation also gave the film a positive review and wrote that "(t)he acting, writing and direction all come together in this movie."

References

External links
 
 
 
 

2016 films
American sports drama films
2010s English-language films
2010s American films